Fort Ye Mon located in Hmawbi Township, Yangon Region, Myanmar. There are at least 12 armed units including 3 training schools.

Order of battle
(1) Special Forces Training School
(2) Military Sport and Seft-defence Institute
(3) 1 Warrant Officer and Non-Commissioned Officer Training School
(4) 7 Infantry Regiments under the command of No.(11) Light Infantry Division (HQ in Inndine)
(5) 1 Field Engineer Company 
(6) 1 Field Medical Company including 1 Field Hospital Unit(80 Bedded)

Military installations of Myanmar
Forts in Myanmar